WNBN (1290 AM) was a radio station broadcasting in the Meridian, Mississippi, Arbitron market.

External link
Station Search Details: DWNBN (Facility ID: 22294)

NBN
Radio stations established in 1988
1988 establishments in Mississippi
Defunct radio stations in the United States
Radio stations disestablished in 2018
2018 disestablishments in Mississippi
Defunct religious radio stations in the United States
NBN